Cloud About Mercury is the second album by guitarist David Torn, supported by Mark Isham,  Tony Levin and Bill Bruford. It was recorded in 1986 and released on the ECM label in March 1987.

Mick Karn replaced Levin for the tour dates

Reception
The Allmusic review by Glenn Astarita awarded the album 5 stars stating "Simply put, Cloud About Mercury looms as one of the finest jazz fusion dates of the '80s, and should be deemed a mandatory purchase for aficionados of this genre".

Track listing
All compositions by David Torn except as indicated
 "Suyafhu Skin... Snapping the Hollow Reed" - 8:21 
 "The Mercury Grid" - 6:33 
 "3 Minutes of Pure Entertainment" - 7:10 
 "Previous Man" (Bill Bruford, Mark Isham, Tony Levin, David Torn) - 7:55 
 "Networks of Sparks: a) The Delicate Code" - 4:52 
 "Networks of Sparks: b) Egg Learns to Walk... Suyafhu Seal" (Bruford, Isham, Levin, Torn/Torn) - 10:25

Personnel
David Torn - electric guitar, acoustic guitar
Mark Isham - trumpet, piccolo trumpet, flugelhorn, synthesizer
Tony Levin - Chapman stick, synthesizer bass
Bill Bruford - Simmons drums, synthesizer-drums, percussion

References

ECM Records albums
David Torn albums
Albums produced by Manfred Eicher
1987 albums